Beno Blachut (14 June 1913 – 10 January 1985) was a lauded Czech operatic tenor. An icon in his own nation, Blachut drew international acclaim through his many commercial recordings of Czech music. He was an instrumental part of the post-World War II school of Czech opera singers that were responsible for popularizing Czech opera internationally. He was highly regarded for his interpretations of roles in operas by Leoš Janáček, Antonín Dvořák, and Bedřich Smetana.

Biography
Born in Ostrava-Vítkovice, Blachut grew up in a poor family of miners. Blachut was highly involved in his church's music program which provided him with his initial musical training as a child and teenager. In 1927, at the age of 14, he began working at an iron factory and from all appearances it seemed he was destined to live a life similar to that of his parents. In the year 1935 he started to study singing at the Prague conservatory.

At the conservatory, Blachut studied under Luis Kadeřábek for four years. He made his professional opera debut at the Olomouc Opera in the role of Jeník in Smetana's The Bartered Bride on 25 December 1938. He sang at the house for the next two years, portraying eighteen different roles (for example: Faust, Canio in Pagliacci, Laca in Jenůfa, Prince in Rusalka) under the direction of Karel Nedbal. In 1941 he left Olomouc to join the roster of principal tenors at the Czech National Opera in Prague, singing Jenik again for his first appearance at that house.

Up to this point, Blachut had mostly portrayed lyric tenor parts, but in Prague he began to sing works from the dramatic repertoire, especially in operas by Janáček, Dvořák, and Smetana. On 3 February 1942 he starred in the world premiere of František Škroup's Columbus (composed in 1855). Outside the Czech repertoire, he sang Alfredo in La traviata, Cavaradossi in Tosca, Don José in Carmen, Ferrando in Così fan tutte, Florestan in Fidelio, Hermann in The Queen of Spades, Lensky in Eugene Onegin, Pierre Bezukhov in War and Peace, Radames in Aida, Walther in Die Meistersinger von Nürnberg, and the title roles in Faust and Otello among other roles.

By 1945 Blachut's performance credits had grown to include almost all of the major tenor parts from the Czech repertory. At this point he was widely view as Czechoslovakia's leading tenor and he appeared on tour with the Czech National Opera in opera performances in Austria, Belgium, Germany, Hungary, Poland, and Russia. He also appeared with the company in England at the 1964 Edinburgh Festival in an acclaimed portrayal of Luka Kuzmič in Janáček's From the House of the Dead. He returned to Edinburgh for another lauded performance in 1970 as Matěj Brouček in The Excursions of Mr. Brouček. That same year he sang in the world premiere of Jiří Pauer's Zdravý nemocný in Prague after Le malade imaginaire by Molière. Blachut was also highly regarded internationally for his portrayal of the title role in Smetana's Dalibor.

In addition to his performances with the Prague Opera, Blachut also occasionally worked as freelance artist, notably making guest appearances at La Fenice, Deutsche Oper Berlin, De Nederlandse Opera, the Finnish National Opera, and the Vienna State Opera. In 1959 he appeared at the Holland Festival as Boris in Káťa Kabanová. Blachut was also active as a concert singer, appearing in productions like Dvořák's Stabat Mater and Janáček's Glagolitic Mass. He was particularly known for his interpretation of Janáček's The Diary of One Who Disappeared and his recording of that work is considered by many critics to be the remaining definitive interpretation.

He died in Prague at the age of 71. He is buried at the Vyšehrad cemetery next to Antonín Dvořák. In 2001 was founded in Prague The Beno Blachut Society (Společnost Beno Blachuta) producing historical recordings of Blachut and his artistic colleagues.

Recordings

Opera recordings

Choral and symphonic recordings

Other recordings

References 

 http://archiv.narodni-divadlo.cz/default.aspx?jz=cs&dk=Umelec.aspx&ju=1191&sz=0&zz=OPR&pn=456affcc-f402-4000-aaff-c11223344aaa

1913 births
1985 deaths
Czech operatic tenors
Musicians from Ostrava
20th-century Czech male opera singers